John Tod (8 October 1862 – 8 September 1935) was a Scotland international rugby union player. He was nicknamed 'The Prince of Dribblers' and it is said that he introduced the dribbling game to rugby union. Tod, himself, rated the later Watsonian player and Scotland international William Cownie as a much better dribbler of the rugby ball than he was, saying that Cownie was the prettiest dribbler he had ever seen touch a rugby ball.

Rugby Union career

Amateur career

He played for Edinburgh University and then Watsonians. A letter to The Scotsman on Tod's death by a "D.P.M" relayed this information:
As stated in your columns on Tuesday Dr John Tod, who died suddenly on Monday while on holiday at Strathpeffer, Ross-shire, was in his younger days an international Rugby forward. John Tod was the first Watsonian to get an international cap. After playing for Edinburgh University, he joined the Watsonians, and captained the side in 1883-4 and 1884-5. His first game for Scotland was in 1884, when we gained a victory over Wales at Newport. He was capped eight times [sic] in all. It was he who introduced the dribbling game to Scottish Rugby. [...] The Watsonian forwards were from that time a power in the land."

Provincial career

He played for East of Scotland District in their trial match against West of Scotland District in January 1883.

He played for Edinburgh District in the 1883, 1884 and 1885 inter-city matches against Glasgow District.

International career

He was capped 9 times - and not 8 times as "D.P.M." counted above - for Scotland in the period 1884 to 1886. He scored 2 tries.

Medical career

He became a G.P. and practiced in Leith. He was prominent in Masonic circles in Edinburgh.

Family

His father was James Robertson Tod (1827-1901) and his mother Ann Campbell (1824-1912). He was one of their 7 children.

He married Mary Bennett in 1907.

Death

He died on holiday at Strathpeffer on the local golf course. Tod was a regular attendee of the Strathpeffer Spa. The Scotsman reported that he had played only one stroke on the golf course before collapsing dead. The Daily Mirror used the headline grabbling line: "First stroke his last" in reporting his death.

References

1862 births
1935 deaths
East of Scotland District players
Edinburgh District (rugby union) players
Edinburgh University RFC players
Rugby union players from Crieff
Scotland international rugby union players
Scottish rugby union players
Watsonians RFC players
Rugby union forwards